The Hermitage of San Antonio de Padua de la Tuna is an archaeological site located near the Guajataca River in Coto, Isabela, Puerto Rico, dating from 1730. It comprises the ruins of a village church that was abandoned in the early 19th century when the community, with the permission of Governor Salvador Meléndez, moved to a more favorable location nearer the coast, which became the modern town of Isabela, founded in 1819.

The hermitage was listed on the U.S. National Register of Historic Places in 1983. The ruins are easily accessible from the main PR-2 road.

History 
Around 1725, Spanish Governor of Puerto Rico José Antonio de Mendizábal y Azares, granted authorization to base a population on the existing hermitage and village. Its given name, San Antonio de La Tuna, derives from the avocation of the Spanish settlers to the saint Anthony of Padua and after the abundance of prickly pears growing in the region (Opuntia or tuna, in Spanish). At the end of the 18th century San Antonio de la Tuna had a church, more than sixty houses, and almost 1,200 inhabitants, which was a considerable population for those times.

Gallery

See also 
 National Register of Historic Places listings in Isabela, Puerto Rico

References

External links 
 , owns, protects, researches, and interprets the ermita 
 Summary sheet from the Puerto Rico State Historic Preservation Office 
 San Antonio de la Tuna – The Original Town of Isabela, Puerto Rico Day Trips travel guide

Isabela, Puerto Rico
Archaeological sites on the National Register of Historic Places in Puerto Rico
Churches on the National Register of Historic Places in Puerto Rico
1730 establishments in New Spain
Christian hermitages
Roman Catholic churches in Puerto Rico
Church ruins
Ruins
Roman Catholic churches completed in 1730
1730s establishments in Puerto Rico